An epibiont (from the Ancient Greek meaning "living on top of") is an organism that lives on the surface of another living organism, called the basibiont ("living underneath"). The interaction between the two organisms is called epibiosis. An epibiont is, by definition, harmless to its host. In this sense, the interaction between the two organisms can be considered neutralistic or commensalistic; as opposed to being, for example, parasitic, in which case one organism benefits at the expense of the other, or mutualistic, in which both organisms obtain some explicit benefit from their coexistence. Examples of common epibionts are barnacles, remoras, and algae, many of which live on the surfaces of larger marine organisms such as whales, sharks, sea turtles, and mangrove trees.

Although there is no direct effect of the epibiont to the host, there are often indirect effects resulting from this interaction and change in the surface of the host. This has been found to be especially important to marine organisms and aquatic ecosystems, as surface qualities do impact necessary ecological functions such as drag, radiation absorption, nutrient uptake, etc.

Types
Epiphytes are plants that grow on the surface of other plants.
Epizoic organisms are those that live on the surface of animals.

See also
 Epiliths, organisms that grow on rocks
 Zoochory, seed dispersal by animals
 Epiphyte, an organism growing on a plant
 Endosymbiont
 Epiphytic bacteria
 Epiphytic fungus

References

External links 
 

Biological interactions